The eleventh series of The Bill, a British television drama, consisted of 149 episodes, broadcast between 5 January – 29 December 1995. Cast members Jaye Griffiths (DI Johnson) and Martin Marquez (DS Pearce) both left their roles as series regulars, being replaced by Russell Boulter & Billy Murray (DSs Boulton and Beech), with Beech taking the place of DS Chris Deakin after he was promoted to DI. Griffiths would go on to return eight years later for a storyline in 2003, while Marquez returned a year later to make one final appearance as a guest actor. While not notable at the time, Murray's character Beech would go on to be the show's longest-running full-time villain in the years that followed. Mark Spalding joined the cast as Chief Inspector Paul Stritch, following the exit of Philip Whitchurch as Chief Inspector Philip Cato, however Spalding left the series before its conclusion after just seven months on the show. Alan Westaway & Andrea Mason joined as probationary PCs Nick Slater and Debbie Keane, while Mary Jo Randle made a brief return as WDS Jo Morgan in the autumn before her character was killed off in a four-part story arc in which a hitman targeted WPC June Ackland. On 6 February 2013, the complete series was released on DVD in Australia.

Cast changes

Arrivals
 DS Don Beech (Episode 14)
 PC Nick Slater (Episode 25)
 WPC Debbie Keane (Episode 25)
 Ch. Insp. Paul Stritch (Episode 33–116)
 WDS Jo Morgan (Episode 110–116) – Returning character
 DS John Boulton (Episode 126)

Departures
 DI Sally Johnson – Forcibly transferred to New Scotland Yard after losing the faith of A/Supt. Conway and DCI Meadows
 Ch. Insp. Philip Cato (Episode 24) – Resigned after realising he would not be promoted
 DS Danny Pearce (Episode 107) – Transferred to AMIP
 DS Jo Morgan (Episode 116) – Killed after a hitman tried to shoot June Ackland
 Ch. Insp. Paul Stritch (Episode 116) – Unexplained

Episodes
{| class="wikitable plainrowheaders" style="width:100%; margin:auto; background:#FFFFFF;"
|-style="color:#844"
! style="background-color:#FAA;" width="20"|#
! style="background-color:#FAA;" width="150"|Title
! style="background-color:#FAA;" width="230"|Episode notes
! style="background-color:#FAA;" width="140"|Directed by
! style="background-color:#FAA;" width="150"|Written by
! style="background-color:#FAA;" width="100"|Original air date

|}

1995 British television seasons
The Bill series